Zubakov (masculine) or Zubakova (feminine) is a Russian surname. Notable people with the surname include:

Valeri Zubakov (born 1946), Russian footballer and manager

See also
Zubkov

Russian-language surnames